Jack Holland may refer to:

 Jack Holland (boxer) (c. 1909 – 1933), American boxer, college football player
 Jack Holland (politician) (1877–1955), Australian politician
 Jack Holland (rugby league) (1922–1994), Australian professional rugby league footballer
 Jack Holland (footballer, born 1861) (1861–1898), English footballer
 Jack Holland (footballer, born 1897) (1897–1944), English footballer
 Jack Holland (writer) (1947–2004), Irish journalist, novelist and poet

See also
 John Holland (disambiguation)